Eudesmia unicincta is a moth of the family Erebidae first described by George Hampson in 1900. It is found in Colombia.

References

Eudesmia
Moths described in 1900